Conochilus is a genus of rotifers belonging to the family Conochilidae.

The genus was first described by Ehrenberg in 1834.

The genus has almost cosmopolitan distribution.

Species:
 Conochilus unicornis Rousselet, 1892

References

Flosculariaceae